The CST–Panvel fast corridor is a proposed elevated suburban rail corridor on the Harbour Line of the Mumbai Suburban Railway for air-conditioned EMUs (Electrical Multiple Units).

History
The CST–Panvel fast corridor was first proposed in the 2009-10 Railway Budget. The proposed corridor would have been 48.3 km long, elevated for 31.6 km of the route and at grade for 12.4 km, where it would have run parallel to existing lines. The corridor would also have required the construction of a 4.3 km bridge over Thane Creek. Rail India Technical and Economic Services Limited (RITES) conducted the techno-economic feasibility study for the corridor. It estimates the project to cost .

In July 2016, the Mumbai Railway Vikas Corporation (MRVC) submitted a new plan for the corridor which received approval from the Railway Board. Under the new plan, the corridor will be 47 km long and include 11 stations. It will begin at Carnac Bunder, near CST's platform 18, and travel towards Wadi Bunder after passing above Mansion Road. From Wadi Bunder, the line passes along Dockyard Road, and then the existing CST-Panvel line until Vashi, before turning right towards Palm Beach Road. The line then follows the existing railway line from Belapur before terminating at Panvel. The CST-Mankhurd and Vashi-Belapur sections of the corridor will be elevated, and the Mankhurd-Vashi and Belapur-Panvel portions will be at grade level. Branch lines will connect the corridor with the Lokmanya Tilak Terminus and the proposed Navi Mumbai International Airport. The airport link will begin before the bridge on the Nerul-Uran railway line.

The Union Cabinet approved  in funding for several projects as part of the Mumbai Urban Transport Project 3A in March 2019. However, the proposed CST-Panvel corridor was dropped from review and did not receive funding.

Cost
The project is estimated to cost . The cost will be shared equally by the MRVC and the Government of Maharashtra.

Infrastructure

Rolling stock
Unlike the Mumbai Suburban Railway, rolling stock on the line will be air-conditioned.

Operations

Frequency
The frequency of train services is estimated at 4.5–5 minutes. The MRVC plans to operate 25 during peak hours. End-to-end travel time on the line will be 50 minutes. A trip from CST to Panvel on the existing Harbour Line takes 90 minutes.

Stations
The line is proposed to have 11 stations.

References

https://www.thehindu.com/news/cities/mumbai/key-rail-infrastructure-projects-for-city-get-centres-green-light/article26460959.ece

See also
 Harbour Line
 Western railway elevated corridor
 Mumbai Suburban Railway

Rail transport in Mumbai
Transport in Thane
Transport in Mumbai
Transport in Navi Mumbai
Mumbai Suburban Railway lines
Transport in Panvel